Tanti Park railway station is a single platform station located on Bungower Road, Mornington, Victoria, Australia. It is the middle stop of three currently serviced by the tourist Mornington Railway.

Tanti Park opened on 18 June 1936 as Mornington Racecourse Platform,. It opened for general traffic on 12 April 1969, and was renamed Tanti Park on 19 December of that year. The current platform was provided in late 1977. Flashing light signals were also provided at the Bungower Road level crossing, located at the Up end of the platform, in that year.

Since mid-2009, the station has been unmanned. It is now a pickup and drop-off point for passengers travelling on the tourist railway. The ticket office is still present, but is not used. A former Rail Motor Stopping Place platform is located across the road from Tanti Park.

References

External links
 Melway map at street-directory.com.au

Tourist railway stations in Melbourne